The Convention on Nuclear Safety is a 1994 International Atomic Energy Agency (IAEA) treaty that governs safety rules at nuclear power plants in state parties to the convention.

The convention creates obligations on state parties to implement certain safety rules and standards at all civil facilities related to nuclear energy. These include issues of site selection; design and construction; operation and safety verification; and emergency preparedness.

The convention was adopted in Vienna, Austria, at an IAEA diplomatic conference on 17 June 1994. It was opened for signature on 20 September 1994 and has been signed by 65 states; it entered into force on 24 October 1996 after it had been ratified by 22 signatories. As of July 2015, there are 78 state parties to the Convention plus the European Atomic Energy Community. The states that have signed the treaty but have not ratified it include Algeria, Cuba, Egypt, Ghana, Iceland, Israel, Jordan, Kazakhstan, Monaco, Morocco, Nicaragua, Nigeria, Philippines, Sudan, Syria, Tunisia, and Uruguay .

External links
Convention on Nuclear Safety, IAEA information page.
Text of Convention.
Signatures and ratifications.

Convention on Nuclear Safety
International Atomic Energy Agency treaties
Convention on Nuclear Safety
Treaties concluded in 1994
Treaties entered into force in 1996
Treaties of Albania
Treaties of Argentina
Treaties of Armenia
Treaties of Australia
Treaties of Austria
Treaties of Bahrain
Treaties of Bangladesh
Treaties of Belarus
Treaties of Belgium
Treaties of Bosnia and Herzegovina
Treaties of Brazil
Treaties of Bulgaria
Treaties of Cambodia
Treaties of Canada
Treaties of Chile
Treaties of the People's Republic of China
Treaties of Croatia
Treaties of Cyprus
Treaties of the Czech Republic
Treaties of Denmark
Treaties of Estonia
Treaties of Finland
Treaties of France
Treaties of Germany
Treaties of Ghana
Treaties of Greece
Treaties of Hungary
Treaties of Iceland
Treaties of India
Treaties of Indonesia
Treaties of Ireland
Treaties of Italy
Treaties of Japan
Treaties of Jordan
Treaties of Kazakhstan
Treaties of South Korea
Treaties of Kuwait
Treaties of Latvia
Treaties of Lebanon
Treaties of the Libyan Arab Jamahiriya
Treaties of Lithuania
Treaties of Luxembourg
Treaties of Mali
Treaties of Malta
Treaties of Mexico
Treaties of Montenegro
Treaties of the Netherlands
Treaties of Nigeria
Treaties of Norway
Treaties of Oman
Treaties of Pakistan
Treaties of Paraguay
Treaties of Peru
Treaties of Poland
Treaties of Portugal
Treaties of Moldova
Treaties of Romania
Treaties of Russia
Treaties of Saudi Arabia
Treaties of Senegal
Treaties of Singapore
Treaties of Slovakia
Treaties of Slovenia
Treaties of South Africa
Treaties of Spain
Treaties of Sri Lanka
Treaties of Sweden
Treaties of Switzerland
Treaties of North Macedonia
Treaties of Tunisia
Treaties of Turkey
Treaties of Ukraine
Treaties of the United Arab Emirates
Treaties of the United Kingdom
Treaties of the United States
Treaties of Uruguay
Treaties of Vietnam
Treaties entered into by the European Atomic Energy Community
Treaties extended to Jersey
Treaties extended to Guernsey
Treaties extended to the Isle of Man